KOPB-TV (channel 10) is a Public Broadcasting Service (PBS) member television station in Portland, Oregon, United States, owned by Oregon Public Broadcasting.

History
KOPB-TV originally signed on the air as KOAP-TV, on February 6, 1961. The call sign letters stood for "Oregon Agricultural Portland", preceded by the K prefix the Federal Communications Commission uses when assigning call signs for stations west of the Mississippi River. It was a sister station to KOAC-TV in Corvallis, Oregon, whose call letterscarried over from KOAC-AM, which received them in the mid-1920s during its early years broadcasting as an AM radio stationstood for "Oregon Agricultural College" (Oregon State University's original name). KOAP-TV was first housed at the campus of Portland State College (now Portland State University), with the transmitter being located on Council Crest. KOAP-TV was a member of NET, or National Educational Television, carrying its programs. On April 30, 1962, KOAP-TV's FM sister service (KOAP-FM) signed on the air. By 1966, most local programs originated at KOAP-TV.

Originally known on-air as OEB (Oregon Educational Broadcasting), the organization running the station changed its name in early 1972 to OEPBS (Oregon Educational & Public Broadcasting Service). The network was spun off from the state board of education in October 1981 and renamed Oregon Public Broadcasting. At the same time, the network moved to Portland, and KOAP-FM/TV became the flagship stations. On February 15, 1989, KOAP changed their call letters to KOPB, for both radio and television.

OPB was a pioneer in HDTV. As early as March 5, 1997, OPB's experimental HDTV station transmitted a random-bit data stream. On September 15, 1997, OPB Portland was assigned the experimental call letters KAXC for channel 35. Then on October 11, 1997, at 4:37 p.m. KAXC became the first TV station in Oregon and one of the first on the west coast to transmit an HDTV picture. After experimentation ended, channel 35 was vacated. On December 7, 2001 KOPB-DT began operation on channel 27.

Digital television

Digital channels
The station's digital signal is multiplexed:

Translators

Analog-to-digital conversion
KOPB-TV shut down its analog signal, over VHF channel 10, on June 12, 2009, the official date in which full-power television stations in the United States transitioned from analog to digital broadcasts under federal mandate. The station's digital signal relocated from its pre-transition UHF channel 27 to VHF channel 10.

References

External links
Oregon Public Broadcasting: Homepage
PBS Homepage
KOPB Engineering site About broadcast facilities of KOPB
KOPB Tower About broadcast facilities of KOPB

PBS member stations
Television channels and stations established in 1961
OPB-TV
1961 establishments in Oregon
Low-power television stations in the United States